Kingston Collegiate and Vocational Institute (KCVI) was a secondary school in Kingston, Ontario, Canada. Founded in 1792 by Reverend John Stuart based upon a grant for secondary education in the colony of Upper Canada, it moved to its location at 235 Frontenac Street in 1892. It is considered the oldest public secondary school in Ontario and the second oldest in Canada.

KCVI was Kingston's only public secondary school until the opening of Queen Elizabeth Collegiate and Vocational Institute (QECVI) in 1955 and Loyalist Collegiate and Vocational Institute (LCVI) in 1963.

In 2012, KCVI was ranked by the Fraser Institute as the top performing school in the Limestone Board and in the top 10 per cent of public schools in Ontario.

KCVI closed in December 2020, its student population moved to Kingston Secondary School, a new school constructed on the former QECVI site that was created to replace both KCVI and QECVI as the result of a Program and Accommodation Review Committee decision reached in 2014.

History
KCVI's history starts with the Kingston Grammar school in 1792. In 1807, the school was renamed Midland District Grammar School. From c. 1825–30, the future first prime minister of Canada, John A. Macdonald, attended the school. In 1853 the school moved to a new location (now Sydenham Public School) and was renamed Kingston County Grammar School. It was renamed Kingston High School in 1871, becoming Kingston Collegiate Institute (KCI) in 1872.

Girls were first admitted as students in January 1877, and the school remained co-educational until its closure in 2020. Fifteen years later, at the institution's centenary in 1892, the school moved to its site on Frontenac Street. Finally, with the addition of a technical and commercial teaching wing in 1931, the school was renamed Kingston Collegiate and Vocational Institute (KCVI), the name it retained until its closure.

The oldest remaining wing of the school is the 1915 wing, which housed science laboratories. The original wing was destroyed by fire but was replaced. The school celebrated its bicentenary in 1992 and celebrated its 225th anniversary in 2017. The school is commonly recognized as the oldest public high school in Ontario and the second oldest in the country.

The school closure and move to former QECVI site was planned to happen at the end of the 2018–19 school year, but was then moved to happen in the middle of the 2019–20 school year. The school closure was delayed again another until the end of the 2019–20 school year in September 2019. The school finally had its last day of in-person classes on December 11, 2020.

Athletics
The team colours were blue and white. The team name for all sports was "Blues" and the mascot was a blue bear. The school competed in various sports including, but not limited to: rowing, cross-country, track and field, football, chess club, advanced chicken plucking, rugby, hockey, basketball, volleyball, soccer, mountain biking, curling, Ping-Pong, tennis, badminton, baseball, golf, swimming, and skiing, along with various other sports.

Coat of arms
A new coat of arms was formally conferred on KCVI by Ray Hnatyshyn, then Governor General of Canada, in 1992. It celebrated KCVI's 200th anniversary.

The Latin motto, maxima debetur pueris reverentia, can be roughly translated to "Youth are entitled to the greatest respect". Another more literal translation would be "The greatest respect is owed to boys". The differences in translation are not an attempt to make the motto more politically correct. The Latin word "puer", refers to a boy (or child) under the age of 17 (juvenis would refer to older youth) and in the plural is used to refer to groups of children of both genders.

IB Diploma program
KCVI was one of 84 schools in Canada that ran the International Baccalaureate program. The IB diploma program was offered at KCVI during the last two years of secondary school. However, there is also the Pre-IB program to prepare the Grade 9 and 10 students for the rigorous pace of the IB curriculum. Also, if students did not want to enroll in the complete IB diploma program, they could apply for IB certificates in the course of their choosing. Students who applied for the IB certificate but were ultimately rejected could still take an IB coure, however it would count as a normal credit and not an IB credit.

SHSM (Specialist High Skills Major)

KCVI offered a SHSM in Arts in Culture and Communication Technologies.

KCVI clubs
KCVI had many different activities going on throughout the school year, such as: the Students' Association – student government, DECA – Student Marketing Club, the student-run Leadership Conference, the improv teams, Mathletes, Model UN, Respect Committee, Outdoors Club, Environment Club, South African Partnership and Youth in Action, Drama Club, Robotics Club and the Debating Club. There was also an Athletics Association in charge of many sport-related school events. The Arts Council was formed in the 2006–07 year as a complement to the Athletic Association. The KCVI Yearbook Committee created a pictorial account of each year in a yearbook called "The Times". As well, KCVI hosted CKVI (The Cave), a radio broadcasting focus program, which broadcast at 91.9 FM in downtown Kingston.

KCVI DECA
KCVI's DECA chapter was the largest and most successful in eastern Ontario, with members competing and winning medals at regional, provincial and international competitions, winning over 100 medals, 20 plaques, and 5 ICDC trophies over the past 9 years. Since its establishment in 2005 until the school's closure in 2020, KCVI's DECA chapter saw significant growth, and registered over 60 members for its 2013-2014 season, making it one of the largest clubs at KCVI at that time. The KCVI DECA chapter also saw active participation within the community of Kingston, having active partnerships with influential businesses and organizations such as VisitKingston.ca, Kingston Community Credit Union, Kingston Economic Development Corporation, and the Queen's University School of Business, raising over $4000 in generous sponsorships and grants.

The KCVI DECA chapter's performance at the 2014 International Career Development Conference in Atlanta, Georgia was its best to that point, taking home over 20 medals and 3 trophies.

In 2018, the club saw Cameron Smith, Vanshik Patel, and Johnson Lee bring home a third place trophy in the category of BOR at the International Career Development Conference in Atlanta, Georgia, the youngest group to do so in KCVI history.

KCVI Improv Team

KCVI has a long and decorated history of competing in the Canadian Improv Games.  Since the Kingston Regional Tournament was re-established in the 1996–97 school year, until school's closure in 2020, KCVI won 10 regional gold medals (including 7 back-to-back regional titles from 1997–2003), three regional silver medals and one regional bronze medal. The team won national bronze in 1998.

The Kingston Model United Nations

KCVI hosted a Model United Nations for several years, held every spring. Recently the Model UN has started to expand outside the school.

K-Botics

K-Botics, otherwise known as  FIRST Robotics Competition Team 2809 was a robotics club started and mentored by two teachers Kevin Wood and Rachel Bearse. K-Botics was an extracurricular program at the school where students design and build a robot from scratch to participate in a game created by FIRST. The game, which changed every year, was not only played by hundreds of robotics teams from around the world, it was also the training ground for future engineers. Traveling to multiple locations throughout the year K-Botics received multiple awards and have been placed in a wide variety of high-ranking positions. The group received support from local companies and community volunteers. K-Botics merged to become Lake Effect Robotics after the 2016 season.

Simon Barber is the current president of the K-Botics team.

Lake Effect Robotics 
Lake Effect Robotics, otherwise known as FRC team 2708 that was formed as a merger of K-Botics, FRC team 2809, and the CyberFalcons, FRC team 3710. Lake Effect Robotics was on the winning alliance at the Detroit FIRST World Championship in 2018.

Student government

Many school events and spirit days at KCVI ware organized and implemented by the SA (Students' Association), the KCVI student government.

Street Smart
Street Smart is a Community Education Centre of the Limestone District School Board where students can earn their high school diploma in a more relaxed environment. They provide on-site secondary education for students aged primarily 16–20 who require an alternative setting for earning high school credits. They are staffed with certified secondary school teachers.

Focus Programs
The Limestone District School Board offered a number of courses that concentrated on a particular field of interest to give students training, academic experience, and work experience that will give them a foundation in that area of study. There were a variety of programs that prepared students for different destinations post-graduation: university, college, apprenticeships, and direct entry into the workplace. The programs offered at KCVI specifically included guitar building and radio broadcast journalism.

Notable students

 J. Adam Brown, actor
 Don Cherry, hockey commentator
 Helen Cooper, federal and municipal politician, Mayor of Kingston 1988–1993
 Robertson Davies, author
 Hugh Dillon, musician and actor 
 Gord Downie, musician and actor, lead singer with The Tragically Hip
 Abdellah Ghassel, Schulich leader 
 Paul D. N. Hebert, biologist, developed the DNA barcoding method of taxonomy 
 Rob Gibson, Olympic medalist
 Rick Howland, actor and musician
 John A. Macdonald, first prime minister of Canada (attended Midland Grammar School, later KCVI, c. 1825-1830)
 Emily Julian McManus, poet, author, and educator
 Peter Milliken, former Speaker of the House of Commons of Canada
 Robert Mundell, nobel laureate and "father of the Euro" 
 Zach Savage, actor, esteemed artist and social media animator 
 Cameron Smith, scientist and Charli DaMelio's childhood friend 
 Adam Tibi, child right's defender 
 David Usher, musician
 Jeremy Wang, better known by the alias Disguised Toast, is a Taiwanese-Canadian streamer, YouTuber, and Internet personality 
 Henry Westman Richardson, Canadian Senator
 Simon Whitfield, Olympic triathlete (Gold Medalist) 
 Connor Wilson, better known as Trap God. 
 Efi Polonsky, Member of the Canadian armed forces currently stationed in Ukraine.

Other
 Members of The Tragically Hip including Downie (see above)

Grade Points competition

Students of KCVI participated in a Grade Points competition, in which different themes days (called "Spirit Days") were decided by the Students' Association and the grade with the most students participating in that theme were awarded grade points. The grade with the most grade points at the end of the year was awarded a prize. Prizes in the past include various pieces of KCVI memorabilia.

Closure
In 2011, The Limestone District School Board Program and Accommodation Review Committee (PARC) began investigating strategies for managing the board's annual budget. The committee focused on investigating the advantages and disadvantages of closing select Kingston high schools that were under-enrolled or over-budget. KCVI was reviewed as a problematic institution by the committee due to the school's crumbling infrastructure and high annual overhead.

The discussion of closing KCVI caused a large disruption among its students, alumni and parents, and opposition to the closure gained support from the community, resulting in the formation of the group "Save Kingston City Schools". Many Kingston residents supported the group and its cause by posting promotional signs on their lawns and partaking in social media campaigns using Facebook. However, in December 2014, a court ruling dismissed an appeal against the closure. On March 24, 2014, 35 million dollars were allocated to the building of a new school, which began construction in November 2017. The new school, known as Kingston Secondary School (KSS), will consolidate the student populations of KCVI and QECVI, as well as relocating the Grade 7/8 french immersion Module Vanier in a 171,000-square foot building on the site of the old QECVI building.

In late September 2017, KCVI marked its 225th anniversary with a large-scale reunion event before the final closure of the school, which was planned at that time for 2019. The school remained open for the 2019-2020 school year, due to a delay in the construction of KSS due to bad weather and province-wide strike action by plumbing unions and sheet metal workers.

By April 2020, it had become clear that KSS would not be ready to open by September of that year, due in part to the provincially-mandated halt on construction imposed in response to the COVID-19 pandemic.

KCVI and Module Vanier's final day of in-person classes took place on December 11, 2020.

Arms

See also
List of high schools in Ontario

References

High schools in Kingston, Ontario
International Baccalaureate schools in Ontario
Educational institutions established in 1792
Educational institutions disestablished in 2020
1792 establishments in Upper Canada
2020 disestablishments in Ontario